Richard Vernon Higgins Burne FSA (19 March 1882 – 9 March 1970) was Archdeacon of Chester from 1937 to 1965.

Burne was educated at Malvern College, Keble College, Oxford and Ripon College Cuddesdon. After a curacy in Slough he became chaplain to the Charles Ferguson-Davie, the Bishop of Singapore, in 1913. During World War I he was a chaplain to the British Armed Forces. After the war he was a tutor at the Ordination Test School, Knutsford; and then its principal from 1923 until his archdeacon’s appointment.

References

1882 births
People educated at Malvern College
Alumni of Keble College, Oxford
Alumni of Ripon College Cuddesdon
Archdeacons of Chester
Fellows of the Society of Antiquaries of London
1970 deaths